Falset (pop. 2,935) is the principal village of the comarca of the Priorat, in Catalonia, very famous for its wine.  It has a castle and two palaces (Medinacelli and Azahara). It is located about 30km inland from Salou on the N420 road. 

The old winery of Falset, also known in Catalonia as one of the Wine Cathedrals, is from Modernisme and Noucentisme style and was designed by the architect Cèsar Martinell.

References

External links 
 Ajuntament de Falset
 Government data pages 

Municipalities in Priorat